Ploner is a surname. Notable people with the surname include:

Alexander Ploner (born 1978), Italian alpine skier
Giuseppe Ploner (born 1959), Italian cross country skier

See also
Plomer